Optioservus browni is a species in the family Elmidae ("riffle beetles"), in the suborder Polyphaga ("water, rove, scarab, long-horned, leaf and snout beetles"). The species is known generally as the "Brown's optioservus riffle beetle".
It is found in North America.

References

Further reading
 Arnett, R. H. Jr., M. C. Thomas, P. E. Skelley and J. H. Frank. (eds.). (21 June 2002). American Beetles, Volume II: Polyphaga: Scarabaeoidea through Curculionoidea. CRC Press LLC, Boca Raton, Florida .
 Arnett, Ross H. (2000). American Insects: A Handbook of the Insects of America North of Mexico. CRC Press.
 Brown, Harley P. (1983). "A catalog of the Coleoptera of America North of Mexico, Family: Elmidae". United States Department of Agriculture, Agriculture Handbook, no. 529-50, x + 23 + i.
 Poole, Robert W., and Patricia Gentili, eds. (1996). "Coleoptera". Nomina Insecta Nearctica: A Check List of the Insects of North America, vol. 1: Coleoptera, Strepsiptera, 41-820.
 Richard E. White. (1983). Peterson Field Guides: Beetles. Houghton Mifflin Company.
 White, D. S. (1978). "A revision of the Nearctic Optioservus (Coleoptera: Elmidae), with descriptions of new species". Systematic Entomology, vol. 3, no. 1, 59–74.

Elmidae